Mike Hamilton (born August 13, 1963 in Brevard, North Carolina) is the former Men's Director of Athletics at the University of Tennessee. Hamilton replaced Doug Dickey in 2003, becoming the University of Tennessee's seventh men's athletic director.

A graduate of Clemson University, Hamilton had been on the university's athletic staff for 11 years prior to his hiring.

In 1998, the National Association of Athletic Development Directors named him Fundraiser of the Year.

On June 7, 2011, Mike Hamilton resigned from his position as the athletic director at the University of Tennessee following months of pressure stemming from numerous issues including sanctions levied against the Tennessee basketball program and numerous head coaching changes in the school's major sports. Hamilton's poor leadership, arrogance, and financial mismanagement are viewed by many as the main reason the Vols football program hit an all-time low during his tenure, from which it has not recovered. Hamilton's duties as an AD were tested when he decided to fire longtime Tennessee football coach Phillip Fulmer. Fulmer was one of Tennessee's winningest head coaches at the time of his dismissal and although many called for his firing after two losing seasons in four years there were also many in his support. Hamilton chose Lane Kiffin as Tennessee's next head coach in December 2008. Many did not believe Kiffin to be the best hire as there were other highly rated potential candidates at the time not to mention Kiffin's controversial history with past coaching jobs. Hamilton's decision would be disastrous as after only one season at Tennessee Kiffin resigned to take the same job at the University of Southern California. Due to a poorly written contract, Kiffin only owed Tennessee $800,000 upon leaving.  Hamilton controversially hired Derek Dooley following Kiffin's departure, despite his losing record at Louisiana Tech. 

The pressure would come to a boil in March 2011 when in the middle of the NCAA's investigation into sanctions against basketball coach Bruce Pearl and but one day before the team was scheduled to face the Michigan Wolverines in the second round of the 2011 NCAA men's basketball tournament, Hamilton announced that Pearl's status as coach going into the game was not certain and at season's end he would be evaluated. Hamilton was scrutinized for making this statement before the team played in the tournament as the pressure it would put on the team may have been the deciding factor in their lopsided 30-point loss to the Wolverines the following day. On the Monday following the game Pearl was dismissed from Tennessee and not soon after Hamilton announced his resignation. Even though Mike Hamilton should not have received any "buyout" with a resignation, University of Tennessee Knoxville Chancellor Jimmy Cheek provided him over $1.3 million in severance, to the confusion and surprise of many.

References

1963 births
Living people
Clemson University alumni
People from Brevard, North Carolina
Tennessee Volunteers and Lady Volunteers athletic directors